At Coney Island, also known as Cohen at Coney Island, is a 1912 American short silent comedy starring Mack Sennett, Mabel Normand, and Ford Sterling. Sennett also directed and produced the film. According to the book Mack Sennett's Fun Factory: A History and Filmography of His Studio and His Keystone and Mack Sennett Comedies, with Biographies of Players and Personnel, Sennett claimed this was the first Keystone Studios production, shot on location at Coney Island on July 4, 1912. It was the eleventh Keystone film released, on a split-reel with A Grocery Clerk's Romance.

There is one known surviving print, and the short has been screened in 2007 and 2012.

Cast
 Mack Sennett as The Boy
 Mabel Normand as The Girl
 Ford Sterling as The Married Flirt
 Gus Pixley as The Other Rival

References

External links
 
At Coney Island on Youtube

1912 comedy films
1912 films
1912 short films
American black-and-white films
Silent American comedy films
American silent short films
Films directed by Mack Sennett
Films set in New York City
Films shot in New York City
Keystone Studios films
American comedy short films
1910s American films